Trio is a collaborative album by American singers Dolly Parton, Linda Ronstadt, and Emmylou Harris. It was released on March 2, 1987, by Warner Bros. Records. The album has platinum certification in the US for sales of one million copies, and has total worldwide sales of approximately four million. A second collaborative album, Trio II, was released in 1999.

Background
Longtime friends and admirers of one another, Parton, Harris, and Ronstadt first attempted to record an album together in the mid-1970s, but scheduling conflicts and other difficulties (including the fact that the three women all recorded for different record labels) prevented its release.

Some of the fruits of those aborted 1970s recording sessions did make it onto the women's respective solo albums. "Mr. Sandman" and "Evangeline" appeared on Harris' album Evangeline and Parton's "My Blue Tears" was included on Ronstadt's 1982 album Get Closer.  Rodney Crowell's "Even Cowgirls Get the Blues" was on Harris' Blue Kentucky Girl album. "Palms of Victory", another track from the aborted 1970s sessions, was included on the Harris' 2007 box set Songbird: Rare Tracks and Forgotten Gems.

Parton and Ronstadt also recorded a version of the traditional ballad "I Never Will Marry", which appeared on Ronstadt's 1977 Simple Dreams album, though that was recorded separately from these sessions, as was Ronstadt's cover of Hank Williams' "I Can't Help It (If I'm Still in Love with You)", from Heart Like a Wheel, on which she was joined by Harris. During this time, Ronstadt and Harris also covered a number of Parton's compositions — Harris covered "Coat of Many Colors" and "To Daddy", and Ronstadt recorded "I Will Always Love You"—for inclusion on their various solo albums during the mid- to late-1970s. Parton, in turn, covered Harris' "Boulder to Birmingham", including it on her 1976 album, All I Can Do.

Finally, a collaboration effort came to fruition, being produced by George Massenburg. When Trio was released in March 1987, it spawned four hit singles–including a remake of Phil Spector's 1958 hit by the Teddy Bears, "To Know Him Is to Love Him".

Critical reception

Billboard published a review in the issue dated March 14, 1987, which said, "If the "new traditionalists" in country music still have a body of work to draw from, it's largely because these three celestial songbirds kept it alive
and vibrant throughout the adulterated '70s. But the members of the trio are not resting on their reputations here; their album is stunningly beautiful on every cut. Crossover is certain and will most likely be instantaneous, fueled by Ronstadt's current ride atop the Hot 100–in a duet with James Ingram–with "Somewhere Out There"."

In the March 14, 1987 issue of Cashbox a review was published that said, "The long-awaited collaboration of three of country/pop’s greatest voices is an unqualified success. The near-perfect song selection gives the three ample room to develop subtleties and nuance that in places is heart rending (listen to "Telling Me Lies"). These three singular voices blend together in seamless harmony, floating over the sweetest country melodies and poignant understated lyrics. Augmented by an assemblage of some of the best sidemen available, including Albert Lee and Mark O’Connor among them."

Commercial performance
The album peaked at No. 6 on the main US Billboard Top 200 Album chart. It peaked at No. 1 on the US Billboard Top Country Albums chart for five weeks. In Canada, the album peaked at No. 4 on the RPM Top Albums chart. In Sweden, it peaked at No. 29 on the Sverigetopplistan Albums Top 60 chart, and in the UK it peaked at No. 60 on the Official Charts Company UK Albums Chart.

The album's first single, "To Know Him Is to Love Him", was released in January 1987 and peaked at No. 1 on the US Billboard Hot Country Singles chart. The single also peaked at No. 1 in Canada on the RPM Country Singles chart. The second single, "Telling Me Lies", was released in May 1987 and peaked at No. 3 on the US Billboard Hot Country Singles chart, No. 35 on the US Billboard Hot Adult Contemporary chart and No. 6 in Canada on the RPM Country Singles chart. "Those Memories of You" was released as the third single in August 1987 and it peaked at No. 5 on the US Billboard Hot Country Singles chart and No. 1 in Canada on the RPM Country Singles chart. The album's fourth and final single, "Wildflowers", was released in March 1988 and peaked at No. 6 on the US Billboard Hot Country Singles chart and No. 8 in Canada on the RPM Country Singles chart.

Accolades
The album won the Grammy Award for Best Country Performance by a Duo or Group with Vocal. It was also nominated for Album of the Year alongside Michael Jackson, U2, Prince, and Whitney Houston. "Telling Me Lies" was also nominated for Best Country Song. The album won the 1987 Academy of Country Music Award for Album of the Year and won Vocal Event of the Year at the Country Music Association Awards at the 1988 ceremony. In December 2020, Trio was inducted into the Grammy Hall of Fame.

30th Annual Grammy Awards

|-
| rowspan="3" style="text-align:center;"|1988
|  rowspan="2" style="text-align:center;"| Trio
| Best Country Performance by a Duo or Group with Vocal
|
|-
| Album of the Year
|
|-
| style="text-align:center;"| "Telling Me Lies"
| Best Country Song
|
|-
|}

22nd Annual Academy of Country Music Awards

|-
| style="text-align:center;"|1987
| style="text-align:center;"| Trio
| Album of the Year
|
|-
|}

22nd Country Music Association Awards

|-
| style="text-align:center;"|1988
| style="text-align:center;"| Trio
| Vocal Event of the Year
|
|-
|}

Track listing

Personnel 
Adapted from the album liner notes.

Musicians
 Emmylou Harris – lead and harmony vocals, acoustic guitar (1, 5, 7), arrangements (11)
 Dolly Parton – lead and harmony vocals
 Linda Ronstadt – lead and harmony vocals
 Bill Payne – acoustic piano (6, 9, 11), electric piano (6), Hammond organ (11), harmonium (11)
 Albert Lee – acoustic guitar solo (1), acoustic guitar (2, 3, 6, 10, 11), high-strung guitar (2, 11), mandolin (5, 7), lead acoustic guitar (8)
 Steve Fishell – pedal steel guitar (1, 6), Dobro (4), Kona Hawaiian guitar (8)
 David Lindley – mandolin (1, 2, 3, 8), Kona Hawaiian guitar (3), autoharp (5, 7), harpolek (5), acoustic guitar (6), dulcimer (10)
 Ry Cooder – Tremolo guitar (3)
 John Starling – acoustic guitar (4), rhythm acoustic guitar (8), arrangements (11)
 Herb Pedersen – banjo (4), vocal arrangements (4, 6)
 Mark O'Connor – viola (1, 2, 5, 7), fiddle (2, 8), acoustic guitar (5), lead acoustic guitar (7), mandolin (10)
 Kenny Edwards – Ferrington acoustic bass (1, 2, 3, 5, 7, 8, 10), electric bass (6)
 Leland Sklar – Ferrington acoustic bass (4)
 Russ Kunkel – drums (1, 2, 3, 5, 6, 8)
 Marty Krystall – clarinet (8)
 Brice Martin – flute (8)
 Jodi Burnett – cello (8)
 Dennis Karmazyn – cello solo (8)
 Novi Novog – viola (8)
 David Campbell – orchestrations and conductor (6, 8)
 Charles Veal – concertmaster (6)
 Avie Lee Parton – arrangements (10)

 Production
 George Massenburg – producer, recording
 Sharon Rice – assistant engineer
 Doug Sax – mastering
 The Mastering Lab (Hollywood, California) – mastering location 
 Liza Edwards – production coordinator
 Robert Blakeman – photography
 John Kosh – art direction, design
 Ron Larson – art direction, design
 John Starling – music consultant

Charts

Weekly charts

Year-end charts

Certifications

References

1987 albums
Emmylou Harris albums
Dolly Parton albums
Linda Ronstadt albums
Warner Records albums
Collaborative albums
Albums produced by George Massenburg